Gerald Dickens may refer to:

Gerald Charles Dickens (1879–1962), Royal Navy admiral
Gerald Charles Dickens (actor) (born 1963), British actor and performer
Gerald R. Dickens, professor of earth sciences at Rice University, Houston, Texas

See also
Peter Gerald Charles Dickens (1917–1987), Royal Navy captain

de:Disa
da:DISA